Shahzeb Khan (born October 8, 1993), better known as ShahZaM, is an American professional Valorant player for G2 Esports. He was a former CS:GO professional player before announcing that he would be officially making the switch to Riot Games' Valorant. He would find most of his success in Valorant as he went on to win their first international LAN tournament in Reykjavik, Iceland.

Career history
On December 15, 2014, he joined Cloud9.

Khan was central in uncovering the iBuyPower and NetcodeGuides match fixing scandal, after he issued a statement confirming that the match at issue had been thrown.

On April 13, 2016, he was released from OpTic Gaming.

On May 19, 2016 Echo Fox replaced AWPer Mohamad "m0E" Assad (who was promoted to general manager), picking up ShahZaM as his replacement.

On December 15, 2016, ShahZaM and Sgares joined Team SoloMid.

On January 17, 2017, ShahZaM and the rest of the Team SoloMid roster were acquired by Misfits Gaming.

On February 7, 2018, ShahZaM joined OpTic Gaming.

On April 27, 2018, ShahZaM joined compLexity Gaming as an AWPer.

On October 28, 2019, ShahZaM was removed from the active roster of compLexity Gaming. The announcement was made in the wake of Complexity's poor performance during the months prior, including their early elimination from the StarSeries Berlin Major. ShahZaM later communicated on his Twitch stream that the team had struggled in large part due to the relative inexperience of many of the team's members, which included the then 16 year old Owen "oBo" Schlatter. ShahZaM expressed frustration with not being able to focus on his primary role of AWPing due to constantly having to perform in-game duties that on a more experienced roster would have been able to take on.

On November 26, 2019, ShahZaM announced his free-agency via Twitter, bringing an official end to his time with CompLexity Gaming. ShahZaM also mentioned his eagerness to find a new team as quickly as possible.

On April 28, 2020, ShahZaM signed with Sentinels, officially making the switch over to Valorant.

On October 6, 2022, ShahZaM was informed live on his Twitch stream that he would not be offered a renewed contract with Sentinels when his current contract expires at the end of the year.

Awards and nominations

References

 

Echo Fox players
American esports players
Counter-Strike players
Pakistani emigrants to the United States
Pakistani esports players
1993 births
Living people
Cloud9 (esports) players
Misfits Gaming players
OpTic Gaming players
Denial Esports players
Tempo Storm players
Team SoloMid players